Korrespondent (literally: Correspondent) is a weekly printed magazine published in Ukraine in the Russian and Ukrainian languages. It is part of United Media Holding group, created by Boris Lozhkin and owned by Serhiy Kurchenko.

History and profile
Korrespondent was established in 2002. The Korrespondent.net is its sister project - an influential Ukrainian and Russian-language online newspaper launched in 2000 and publishing part of the magazine's content online for free.

Korrespondent is a member of Ukrainian Association of Press Publishers (UAPP).

Korrespondent rankings
Korrespondent was the first Ukrainian media to compose and publish various rankings of the society. Most popular among them are the annually updated "TOP 100 Most influential Ukrainians", "Rating of the richest people in Ukraine", Personality of the Year and "10 best cities for living In Ukraine".

Top 100

Since 2003 Korrespondent ranks the 100 most influential individuals who significantly influenced economic, business, political or societal development in Ukraine during the year. The list is published in the late August issue of the magazine. The people that have been ranked number one on Korrespondents are:

Rating of the richest people in Ukraine
Since 2006, Rinat Akhmetov has always been declared Ukraine's richest person. Ihor Kolomoyskyi has always been ranked as either No.2 or No.3.

See also
List of magazines in Ukraine

Notesa.' 
The age indicates how old the person was at the time of being nominated and not the person's current age.

References

External links

2002 establishments in Ukraine
Magazines established in 2002
Magazines published in Kyiv
News magazines published in Ukraine
Russian-language magazines
Ukrainian-language magazines
Weekly news magazines